Doctor and Son is a 1959 comedy novel by the British writer Richard Gordon. It is the fifth novel in Gordon's Doctor series. Returning from his honeymoon, Simon Sparrow looks forwards to time spent at his new home. However his peace is interrupted when his friend Doctor Grimsdyke invites himself to stay, as well as the interventions of his mentor Sir Lancelot Spratt.

References

Bibliography
 Pringle, David. Imaginary People: A Who's who of Fictional Characters from the Eighteenth Century to the Present Day. Scolar Press, 1996.

1959 British novels
Novels by Richard Gordon
Comedy novels
Michael Joseph books